The word lunula means little moon and may also refer to:

 Lunula (amulet), a Roman amulet worn by girls, the equivalent of the bulla worn by boys
 Lunula (anatomy), the pale half-moon shape at the base of a fingernail
 Lunule (bivalve), a crescent-moon shaped area on the shells of some marine bivalves
 Two round brackets and the text between them
 Gold lunula, a specific kind of archaeological solid collar or necklace from the Bronze Age or later
 The openings in the test of a sand dollar
 Calophasia lunula, a species of moth
 Chaetodon lunula, a species of butterflyfish

See also
 Lunette (disambiguation)
 Lune (disambiguation)